Eupoecilia eucalypta is a species of moth of the family Tortricidae. It is found in Sri Lanka.

This species has a wingspan of 10 mm.

References

Moths described in 1928
Eupoecilia